The library of Philippopolis is one of the administrative buildings built in the Northern part of the Roman forum in Plovdiv. The rectangular-shaped building has an approximate width of 20m and length of 15m. The library's main purpose was storing manuscripts and scrolls but it was also used as a place for education, reading, public discussions and speeches. Philippopolis was among the few ancient towns which had a library.

Location 
The library has been found near General Gurko str. in the Northeastern corner of the Roman forum in Plovdiv, adjacent to the Roman odeon. The building  of Plovdiv's central post office and the main pedestrian street of the city are located around the ancient monument.

The library 

One of the most interesting features of the ancient library is the construction of interior walls. When constructing the Roman bricks masonry multiple niches were formed in the interior of the walls. Archeologists suggest that wooden storage cabinets were placed there in which scrolls were kept. The floor was paved with marble slabs.

The library had an air circulation system in order to prevent humidity and moisture from damaging papyrus scrolls. Vertical clay pipes were embedded in the thick brick walls of the building to take the moisture out. They ended in a channel which was connected to the drainage system of the Roman forum.

Conservation and restoration 
The library of Philippopolis was discovered in the 1980s during the archeological research in the central Plovdiv. Currently, the western part of the building is still hidden beneath modern buildings.

External links
 Roman Plovdiv

References

Ancient libraries
Roman sites in Bulgaria
Tourist attractions in Plovdiv
Philippopolis (Thrace)